Gabriel Horenczyk is a social psychologist who has conducted various studies on acculturation and cultural identity. He is currently employed at the Hebrew University of Jerusalem in Israel.

Main publications
Horenczyk (1997). Immigrants' perceptions of host attitudes and their reconstruction of cultural groups. Applied Psychology, 46(1), 34–38.
Phinney, Horenczyk, Liebkind & Vedder (2000). Ethnic identity, immigration, and well-being: An interactional perspective. Journal of Social Issues, 57(3), 493–510.
Roccas, Horenczyk & Schwartz (2000). Acculturation discrepancies and well-being: the moderating role of conformity. European Journal of Social Psychology, 30(3), 323–334.

References

Living people
Israeli psychologists
Year of birth missing (living people)
Israeli people of Polish descent